Right of Way is a trance album by DJ Ferry Corsten. It was the first album to be released under his own name. The album spawned four singles: "Punk" (UK #29), "Rock Your Body, Rock" (UK #11), "It's Time" (UK #51) and "Right of Way" (UK #76)

Track listing
"Sublime"  – 7:46
"Whatever!"  – 4:47
"Rock Your Body, Rock"  – 5:15
"Right of Way"  – 7:46
"Kyoto"  – 6:10
"Holding On (feat. Shelley Harland)"  – 3:47
"Sweet Sorrow"  – 6:15
"Hearts Connected"  – 6:37
"Punk"  – 4:45
"It's Time"  – 5:22
"Show Your Style (feat. Birgit)"  – 3:10
"Star Traveller"  – 6:13
"Skindeep"  – 3:44
"In My Dreams"  – 6:03

 Track 2, "Whatever!", contains a beat slightly similar to the "Whatever" song by Ayumi Hamasaki. Not to be confused with the actual remix of Ayumi's version done by Ferry Corsten.

Charts

References

External links

2003 albums
Ferry Corsten albums